The Kim Perrot Sportsmanship Award is an annual Women's National Basketball Association (WNBA) award given since the league's inaugural season, to the player who most "exemplifies the ideals of sportsmanship on the court—ethical behavior, fair play and integrity." This is the same criterion used by the analogous NBA Sportsmanship Award, given by the NBA since its 1995–96 season.

Every year, each of the WNBA teams nominates one of its players to compete for this award. From these nominees, a panel of sportswriters and broadcasters vote for first and second place winners of this award. First place selections receive two votes, while second place selections receive one. The player with the highest point total, regardless of the number of first-place votes, wins the award.

Since the 2000 WNBA season, the award is named for the late Kim Perrot, who helped guide the Houston Comets to their first two WNBA championships before she died in August, 1999, after suffering from cancer for seven months.

Winners

Notes
 Denotes a player who is a United States citizen but is naturalized and represents a different country internationally.

See also

 List of sports awards honoring women

References

Awards established in 1997
Kim
Sportsmanship trophies and awards